Omrit, or Khirbat ‘Umayrī, is the site of an ancient Roman temple in the Israel–Syria demilitarised zone.

It is believed that Omrit was built by Herod the Great in honor of Augustus around 20 BCE. The site was destroyed in the Galilee earthquake of 363; a small chapel was later built on its ruins in the Byzantine period.

History

Omrit is situated atop a foothill of Mount Hermon, overlooking Hula Lake. The site is located approximately 2.5 miles southwest of Banias, adjacent to a Roman road connecting Scythopolis and Damascus.

According to the first-century historian Josephus, in addition to reconstructing he Second Temple in Jerusalem, Herod built another three temples: one in Caesarea Maritima, one in Sebastia, and one near Banias. Given Omrit's proximity to Banias and the presence of an ancient temple adorned with Corinthian capitals, it is very likely that Omrit is the site of the fourth temple built by Herod.

After a brushfire cleared the area in 1998, archaeological excavations began, being led by Professor Andrew J. Overman of Macalester College, with the assistance of nearby Kfar Szold. The region was well trodden by Roman influence, and thus far excavations have yielded three phases of temple construction approximated at mid 1st century BCE, 20 BCE and 1st century CE. The temple compound, in the center of the hill, was connected to the road by way of a street lined with columns, as was customary in the eastern provinces of the Roman Empire. It continued to be used into the Byzantine period. The remains of shops and installations such as a wine press, were discovered there.

Gallery

See also
 Herodian architecture
 Archaeology of Israel

References

Bibliography 
 J. Andrew Overman, Daniel N. Schowalter (eds.): The Roman Temple Complex at Horvat Omrit: An Interim Report. BAR International Series vol. 2205. Oxford: Archaeopress 2011. 978-1-4073-0763-3
 Michael C. Nelson (ed.): The Temple Complex at Horvat Omrit 1: The Architecture. The Brill Reference Library of Judaism vol. 45. Leiden/Boston: Brill 2015.

External links

 Macalester Website 
 Kh. Omrit on http://www.biblewalks.com

Archaeological sites in Israel
Establishments in the Herodian kingdom
Roman temples of the Imperial cult
Buildings and structures completed in the 1st century BC
20 BC establishments